Daniel Joseph O'Hern (May 23, 1930 – April 1, 2009) was a former Associate Justice of the New Jersey Supreme Court, where he served from August 6, 1981 until his retirement upon his 70th birthday.

Life and career
O'Hern was born in Red Bank in 1930 and attended Regis High School on the Upper East Side of Manhattan. He graduated from Fordham College in 1951. O'Hern served in the United States Navy from 1951 to 1954, during the Korean War, attaining the rank of Lieutenant, Junior Grade. After leaving active duty, he graduated from Harvard Law School in 1957, and served as a clerk to United States Supreme Court Justice William J. Brennan, Jr.

He was an elected official in his hometown of Red Bank, serving on its borough council and as Mayor of Red Bank, New Jersey. Brendan Byrne, the Governor of New Jersey  named O'Hern a commissioner of the New Jersey Department of Environmental Protection, and later as Counsel to the Governor. Byrne submitted his Supreme Court nomination to the New Jersey Senate, and he was confirmed on May 20, 1981, and sworn in on August 6, 1981.

Judge O'Hern's opinion in State in the Interest of T. L. O. (1983) concerning administrative or teacher searches of public school students was reversed by the U.S. Supreme Court in New Jersey v. T. L. O. (1985).

He retired at age 70, and was replaced by James R. Zazzali.

O'Hern and his wife Barbara have been residents of Little Silver, New Jersey. Their daughter, Eileen Marie O'Hern, married William Kent Luby.

O'Hern died at age 78 on April 1, 2009 due to brain cancer at his home in Red Bank.

O'Hern was noted for his "Sal's tavern" test, which suggested that if an opinion wouldn't make sense to the "gang" at Sal's Tavern in Red Bank, New Jersey it should be rewritten.

The train station in Red Bank was named in his honor in November 2014.

See also 
 List of law clerks of the Supreme Court of the United States (Seat 3)

References

1930 births
2009 deaths
Deaths from brain cancer in the United States
Fordham University alumni
Harvard Law School alumni
Justices of the Supreme Court of New Jersey
Law clerks of the Supreme Court of the United States
People from Little Silver, New Jersey
People from Red Bank, New Jersey
United States Navy officers
Mayors of Red Bank, New Jersey
20th-century American judges
Military personnel from New Jersey